Standing Ovation (subtitled 3 Eras of Basie Recorded Live at the Tropicana Hotel, Las Vegas) is a live album by pianist and bandleader Count Basie featuring performances recorded at the Tropicana Resort & Casino in Las Vegas in 1969 and released on the Dot label.

Reception

AllMusic awarded the album 4 stars stating "The music is, of course, great, and the players respond to the excitement of the live audience".

Track listing
 "Down for Double" (Freddie Green) - 3:02
 "Li'l Darlin'" (Neal Hefti) - 4:52
 "Broadway" (Bill Byrd, Teddy McRae, Henri Woode) - 3:34
 "Jive at Five" (Count Basie, Harry Edison) - 3:57
 "Cherry Point" (Hefti) - 5:00
 "Jumpin' at the Woodside" (Basie) - 3:34
 "One O'Clock Jump" (Basie) - 1:17
 "Shiny Stockings" (Frank Foster) - 5:05
 "Blue and Sentimental" (Basie, Mack David, Jerry Livingston) - 4:28
 "Every Tub" (Basie, Eddie Durham) - 2:55
 "Corner Pocket" (Green) - 5:56
 "The Kid from Red Bank" (Hefti) - 2:30
 "One O'Clock Jump" (Basie) - 1:31

Personnel 
Count Basie - piano
Al Aarons, Oscar Brashear, Gene Goe, Sonny Cohn, Harry Edison - trumpet 
Richard Boone, Frank Hooks, Grover Mitchell - trombone
Bill Hughes - bass trombone
Marshal Royal - alto saxophone 
Bobby Plater - alto saxophone, piccolo
Eric Dixon - tenor saxophone, flute
Eddie "Lockjaw" Davis - tenor saxophone
Charlie Fowlkes - baritone saxophone
Freddie Green - guitar
Norman Keenan  - bass
Harold Jones - drums

References 

1969 live albums
Count Basie Orchestra live albums
Dot Records live albums
Albums produced by Teddy Reig
Albums arranged by Sammy Nestico
Albums recorded at the Tropicana Las Vegas